Pachyacris is a genus of grasshoppers in the subfamily Cyrtacanthacridinae with no assigned tribe.  Species are recorded from sub-continental India, Indo-China through to Vietnam.

Species
The Orthoptera Species File. lists:
Pachyacris compressa Rehn, 1941
Pachyacris vinosa (Walker, 1870)
Pachyacris violascens (Walker, 1870) - type species (as Acridium violascens Walker F)

References

External links 
 

Acrididae genera
Cyrtacanthacridinae 
Orthoptera of Asia
Orthoptera of Indo-China
Taxa named by Boris Uvarov